Alycaeidae is a taxonomic family of small to large tropical land snails  with an operculum, terrestrial gastropod mollusks in the superfamily Cyclophoroidea.

Genera
 Alycaeus Gray, 1850
 Chamalycaeus Kobelt & Möllendorff, 1897
 Dicharax Kobelt & Möllendorff, 1900
 Dioryx Benson, 1859
 Laotia Saurin, 1953
 Messageria Bavay & Dautzenberg, 1904
 Metalycaeus Pilsbry, 1900
 Pincerna Preston, 1907
 Stomacosmethis Bollinger, 1918
Synonyms
 Alcaeus Gray, 1850: synonym of Alycaeus Gray, 1850 (incorrect subsequent spelling)
 Awalycaeus Kuroda, 1951: synonym of Dicharax Kobelt & Möllendorff, 1900 (junior synonym)

References

External links
 Blanford, W. T. (1864). On the classification of the Cyclostomacea of eastern Asia. Annals and Magazine of Natural History. (3) 13(78): 441-465
 Páll-Gergely, B., Sajan, S., Tripathy, B., Meng, K., Asami, T. & Ablett, J.D. (2020). Genus-level revision of the Alycaeidae (Gastropoda: Cyclophoroidea), with an annotated species catalog. ZooKeys. 981: 1–220

Cyclophoroidea